Mount Dowe is a mountain in the North West Slopes region of New South Wales, Australia. It is part of an old shield volcano that was active around 18 million years ago.

On the mountain peak are television and radio transmitters which broadcast to locations such as Moree, Tamworth, Gunnedah and Narrabri as it provides a prime location to give television coverage to vast areas in the North West Slopes and Plains region.

The summit of Mount Dowe is often  colder than the valley floor. Mount Dowe can also receive snow during winter but usually this is only a light dusting.

See also 

 List of mountains in New South Wales

References

Dowe
Moree Plains Shire